Sivagalai is a village in the Tuticorin district of Tamil Nadu, India. It is surrounded by small hamlets like Nainarpuram, Paramboo, Pottal, Parakiramapandi, Monkottapuran and Aavarangadu. The district capital Tuticorin is 30 km from the village and Srivaikundam and Eral is 10 km and 6 km from the village respectively.

History 
Sivagalai was once called as "Small Ceylon" by the Britishers, as it is surrounded by many lakes. By San.

Demographics 

The population of the village is about 11,000, including 6000 males and 5000 females. Hinduism is followed by majority of the population, with Christians and the Muslims making up most of the rest of the population. The village has a church called the St. Trinity church which is surrounded by a lot of temples.

Agriculture is the major source of income for the villagers. Most of the men from this village are working as drivers and conductors in Tamil Nadu transport corporation and while being as farmers.

Arulmigu Muthumalai sri muppidari amman, pathirakali amman, sivananaindha perumal, ponnurivi amman, Irullappa samy, Muniya samy, irulli ammal and other gods are worshiped by Nadar and Pillaimar community. Nadar thirumana mandapam is at the main road of sivagalai.

Education 
The village has one Higher secondary school, one middle school and four primary schools.

References

Villages in Thoothukudi district